V-snoRNA1 is a box CD-snoRNA identified in B lymphocytes infected with the Epstein–Barr virus (human herpesvirus 4 (HHV-4)). This snoRNA is the first known example of a snoRNA expressed from a viral genome. It is homologous to eukaryotic snoRNAs because it contains the C and D boxes sequence motifs but lacks a terminal stem-loop structure. The nucleolar localization of v-snoRNA1 was determined by in situ hybridization. V-snoRNA1 can form into a ribonucleoprotein complex (snoRNP) as co-immunoprecipitation (CoIP) assays showed that this snoRNA interacts with the snoRNA core proteins, fibrillarin, Nop56, Nop58. It has also been proposed that this snoRNA may act as a miRNA-like precursor that is processed into 24-nucleotide-sized RNA fragments that target the 3'UTR of viral DNA polymerase mRNA.

See also 
 Epstein–Barr virus stable intronic sequence RNAs

References

External links 
 
 
 
 

Molecular genetics
Non-coding RNA
Epstein–Barr virus